The Connect Music Festival was a music festival that took place in the grounds of Inveraray Castle, located on the banks of Loch Fyne in Argyll, Scotland. It was aimed at more mature music fans and recent headliners included the Beastie Boys, Björk and Franz Ferdinand. The inaugural festival was held in 2007 and was repeated in 2008, sponsored by SSE and named Hydro Connect. The festival did not take place in 2009 or 2010 with the organisers blaming high running costs and the effects of the Financial crisis of 2007–2010.

Format
It is composed of five stages of music and two other areas:
The Oyster Stage - Main Stage hosting the headline acts and other bands
Guitars & Other Machines - More popular and less well known rock bands
Manicured Noise - Electronic and Dance acts
Unknown Pleasures - Ambient acts (playing through the night)
The Double Six Club - A drinking and social area
Circuses and Bread - Food and drink area
Your Sound Bandstand - Unsigned and new Scottish acts chosen by the Your Sound Network

2007 Festival
The festival was held between 31 August and 2 September 2007. The festival - due to the large crowds and rain during the weekend - damaged the Winterton shinty pitch, home of Inveraray Shinty Club, meaning that the pitch was unplayable for the rest of the 2007 season.

Line-up

Oyster Stage

Guitars & Other Machines

Manicured Noise

Your Sound
The bandstand stage, set for new and rising bands, included performances from Frightened Rabbit (Saturday), Rick Redbeard (Saturday) and The Twilight Sad (Sunday, playing directly following headliner Björk).

2008 Festival
In 2008, the festival changed its name to Hydro Connect due to sponsorship from Scottish Hydro Electric. It was held between Friday 29 August and Sunday 31 August.

Line-up
Artists performing included Manic Street Preachers, Bloc Party, Franz Ferdinand, Amy MacDonald, Sigur Rós, Goldfrapp, Paolo Nutini, Kasabian, Glasvegas, Mercury Rev, Gossip, Elbow, Duffy, The Coral, Ladytron, The Roots, Sparks, Crystal Castles, Young Knives, Santigold, Joan As Police Woman, Gomez, Foy Vance and Noah and the Whale.

References

External links
BBC Coverage

Electronic music festivals in the United Kingdom
Music festivals in Scotland
Music in Argyll and Bute
2007 establishments in Scotland
2008 disestablishments in Scotland
Music festivals established in 2007
Music festivals disestablished in 2008